Ofentse Mwase is a South African director, filmmaker and  the founder of Ofentse Mwase Films. Born and raised in  Rustenburg, North West, Mwase studied film and cinematography at AFDA, The School for the Creative Economy.

Career 
Ofentse Mwase was born in Rustenburg, North West, South Africa. His filmmaking interest  began in 2005. In 2009, he shot a Short film iGolide, and receive nomination for  Best Cinematographer of 2010.

Two years later, in 2011 he shot The Hajji short film, which was nominated for Best Cinematography at AFDA.  Mwase won Best Cinematography for a TV Drama  Tjovitjo at the SAFTA’s annual ceremony in 2018. Same year  he also shot Thato, a Sterkinekor, which won Silver Loerie at the 2011 Loerie Awards.

In 2017, Ofentse directed a Music Video for Ameni by Miss Pru featuring Sjava, A-Reece, Emtee, Fifi Cooper, Saudi and B3nchmarq which went on to win his 1st SAMA(South African Music Awards) for Music Video Of the Year 2017. He shot his first feature film Collision directed by Fabien Martorell, which will premier on June 16, 2022 on Netflix.

Filmography

Awards  

! 
|-
|2017
|rowspan="3"|OM Films
|Music Video of the Year
|
|
|-
|2018
|Best Cinematography
|
|
|-
| 2020 
| Best Produced Music Video
|
|
|-
|rowspan="2"|2021
| Ofentse Mwase 
| Best Video Director
| 
| 
|-
| "Mali Eningi"
| Best Video 
|

References

External links

Living people

Year of birth missing (living people)
South African directors
South African music video directors
South African cinematographers